Ursula Sladek (born 6 September 1946) owns a small local power company, Schönau Power Supply, located in Schönau im Schwarzwald, Germany, that provides electricity from renewable energy sources to the German electricity grid. Her company "gets much of its energy from small local energy producers, including a handful of hydropower operations, solar panels, some wind turbines, and about 20 washing-machine-size co-generation plants in people’s homes that produce both heat for the home and electricity for the grid". Sladek has also been interested in finding ways of rendering nuclear power unnecessary in Germany: Sladek won a Goldman Environmental Prize in 2011.

Background
In 1986, she was a homemaker and the mother of five school-age children when some radioactive isotopes blown into the air by the explosion at the Chernobyl nuclear power plant in the Ukraine landed around her town, Schönau, in the Black Forest in western Germany. Her children could not play outdoors for two weeks; 25 years later, that forest’s mushrooms are still considered unsafe. 

Trained as a schoolteacher, Sladek began to study the energy industry in Germany to see if there were ways to decrease dependence on nuclear power. Together with her husband, Michael Sladek, she formed a group called "Parents for a Nuclear Free Future" to promote energy efficiency in the Black Forest region of Germany, and return control of energy production and distribution to the community. In 1991, when the previous power company's lease to supply power to the Schönau region was up for renewal, Sladek and her partners began a nationwide fundraising effort to enable them to take ownership of the local power grid.  They were able to raise 6 million DM (about 3 million Euros) and by 1997 had established the Schönau Power Supply as a community operated energy provider committed to a sustainable energy future. The Schönau Power Supply uses a decentralized approach to power generation, and makes use of renewable energy sources, including solar, hydroelectric, wind power, and biomass. The company is operated as a cooperative; while the cooperative owners receive dividends, the majority of the profits are re-invested in renewable energy sources. Total revenues reached 67 million Euros in 2009.

Awards and recognition
Ursula Sladek has won many awards for her work in the fields of energy conservation and renewable energy production, including the German Federal Cross of Merit, the Henry Ford European Conservation Award, the German Founder of the Year Award, the International Nuclear-Free Future Award, the German Energy Prize, and the European Solar Prize, and was elected an Ashoka Fellow in 2008. Sladek won a Goldman Environmental Prize in 2011.

See also
Eurosolar
Renewable energy commercialization
Michael Sladek
World Future Council
Hans-Josef Fell
Anti-nuclear movement in Germany

References

People associated with solar power
People associated with renewable energy
Living people
German women engineers
Recipients of the Cross of the Order of Merit of the Federal Republic of Germany
Recipients of the Order of Merit of Baden-Württemberg
1946 births
German schoolteachers
People from Lörrach (district)
Engineers from Baden-Württemberg
Goldman Environmental Prize awardees
Ashoka Fellows